Andy González Núñez (born 17 October 1987 in Plaza de la Revolución, La Habana) is a Cuban middle-distance runner who competes in the 800 metres. He was the gold medalist in the event at the 2011 Pan American Games. He represented his country at the 2008 and 2012 Summer Olympics.

Biography
González emerged as an international level runner in 2006. That year he ran 1:47.5 minutes for the 800 m and a national junior record of 3:42.6 minutes for the 1500 metres. He was chosen to represent Cuba at the 2006 Central American and Caribbean Games and he surprised by winning the 800 m gold medal, defeating Sherridan Kirk and running a time of 1:46.26 minutes (the fastest ever by a Central American and Caribbean junior). He was one of the highest ranked runners to enter the 800 m at the 2006 World Junior Championships in Athletics, but he was off-form in the final and finished eighth in a time of 1:53.61 minutes.

The following year he competed at the 2007 Pan American Games and came fifth in the 800 m final – an event which was won by his more experienced compatriot Yeimer López. At the start of 2008 he ran a personal best of 1:45.3 minutes for the 800 m in Havana. He then set a championship record to win the event at the 2008 Ibero-American Championships in Athletics and achieved the same feat at the 2008 Central American and Caribbean Championships. González received his first call-up to the Cuban Olympic team and was narrowly eliminated in the first round of the 800 m – he was the fastest runner not to qualify.

In 2009, he came runner-up to Yeimer López at the national Barrientos Memorial meet in Havana. The city hosted the  2009 CAC Championships in July and an attempt to defend his 800 m title resulted in a duel between him and López, but González again finished behind his fellow Cuban. He improved his 1500 m running in 2010, taking the title at the Barrientos Memorial and finishing the year with a new personal best of 3:40.94 minutes. He also achieved a season's best of 1:45.40 minutes for the 800 m that year.

González returned to international competition in 2011 and had a highly successful year. He ran his season's best of 1:45.67 minutes at the Barrientos Memorial, although he was narrowly outrun to the title by the emerging Raidel Acea. The 2011 Central American and Caribbean Championships in Athletics saw him return to the top of the podium as he beat Haiti's Moise Joseph to win his second 800 m title at the competition. At the 2011 Pan American Games in October, he outran Brazil's Kleberson Davide in the final straight to claim his first major 800 m title.  He competed in the 800 m at the 2013 World Athletics Championships.  At the 2014 Central American and Caribbean Games, González did the 800 m and 1500 m double, winning both events.

Personal best
400 m: 47.41 s –  La Habana, 1 March 2014
800 m: 1:45.3 min (ht) –  La Habana, 13 March 2008
1500 m: 3:42.4 min (ht) –  La Habana, 15 March 2008
3000 m: 8:24.3 min (ht) –  Santa Clara, 3 April 2009

Competition record

References

External links

Tilastopaja biography

Living people
1987 births
Cuban male middle-distance runners
Olympic athletes of Cuba
Athletes (track and field) at the 2008 Summer Olympics
Athletes (track and field) at the 2012 Summer Olympics
Athletes (track and field) at the 2011 Pan American Games
Athletes from Havana
Pan American Games gold medalists for Cuba
Pan American Games medalists in athletics (track and field)
World Athletics Championships athletes for Cuba
Central American and Caribbean Games gold medalists for Cuba
Competitors at the 2006 Central American and Caribbean Games
Competitors at the 2014 Central American and Caribbean Games
Central American and Caribbean Games medalists in athletics
Medalists at the 2011 Pan American Games
21st-century Cuban people